Studenec is a village west of Postojna in the Inner Carniola region of Slovenia.

The local church in the settlement is dedicated to Saint Barbara and belongs to the Parish of Hrenovice.

References

External links
Studenec on Geopedia

Populated places in the Municipality of Postojna